Guðmundur Steinn Gunnarsson (born 1982) is an Icelandic composer, performer and a founding member of S.L.Á.T.U.R., an experimental arts organization in Reykjavík. In his compositions he has developed a rhythmic language devoid of regular beat or metre, and he has created a new musical notation to represent his music.

Biography
Guðmundur Steinn was born in Reykjavík, Iceland in 1982. He studied at the Iceland Academy of the Arts, graduating in 2005, and then at Mills College in Oakland, California, where he gained an M.A. degree with a thesis entitled "An Approach to Rhythm". His teachers have included Atli Ingólfsson, Úlfar Haraldsson, Hilmar ór Arson and Hilmar Jensson in Iceland, and Alvin Curran, Fred Frith and John Bischoff at Mills College. He also attended Karlheinz Stockhausen’s courses in Kürten in 2004, went to the Darmstädter Ferienkurse in 2008 and has had masterclasses with Helmut Lachenmann, Tristan Murail, Pauline Oliveros and Clarence Barlow.

Music
Guðmundur Steinn's musical style combines sound patterns without using a rigid rhythmic grid structure or pulse. This approach has led to the development of his animated notation, or '', instead of using traditional musical scores. During the performance, the musicians follow specific instructions that move across a computer screen. This rhythmic language and animated notation and the structural methods he uses in composition were the subject of his M.A. thesis in Mills College. As Guðmundur Steinn explains, "By intently focusing on small differences, both in rhythm and pitch, the ear gets tuned to a microscopic mode of listening. When things then open up, a new sense of variety is gained."

Works have been performed at events in both Scandinavia and the USA, including the Reno Interdisciplinary Arts Festival, Music for People and Thingamajigs, U.N.M. (Ung Nordisk Musik), Time of Music, Dark Music Days, Nordic Music Days (2009 and 2010), and Ung Nordisk Musik. Performers of his works have included Quartet San Francisco, The Zapolski Quartet Ensemble Adapter, Defun, Duo Harpverk, Shayna Dunkelmann, Tinna Þorsteinsdóttir, Quartet Opabinia, The Zapolski Quartet and Atón/Njútón. Guðmundur Steinn also participates in improvisatory performances, and has performed with Steve Hubback, Fred Frith, Andrew D'Angelo, Ad Peijnenburg, Hilmar Jensson and Skúli Sverrisson

Guðmundur Steinn is a founding member of the S.L.Á.T.U.R. ("samtök listrænt ágengra tónsmiða umhverfis Reykjavík" or "The Association of Artistically Obtrusive Composers around Reykjavík"), an experimental composers collective in Iceland, and he is co-curator of the festival Sláturtíð. He also a co-curates the concert series Jaðarber at the Reykjavík Art Museum.

Awards
2011 – 80th anniversary National Radio of Iceland Composition Prize
2005 – musical director of the film Hidebound (Þröng Sýn) which gained a special prize for music at the NUFF Nordic Youth Film Festival in Norway

Recordings
2011 – Horpma – an album released by Carrier Records
his music has also featured on albums available on the Bad Taste label in Reykjavík and Edgetone in San Francisco

Works
Guðmundur Steinn's works include:
 (2012) for flute, bass clarinet, bassoon, horn, trumpet, trombone, percussion, piano, 2 violins, viola, cello and double bass
 (2011) for flute choir with contrabass flute solo
 (2011) for orchestra, traditional notation
 (2011) for 4 voices, open instrumentation and 2 voices audience participation
 (2011) for accordion and piano
 (2011) for flute choir
2 Songs for Accordion (2011) for solo accordion
 (2011) for 4 recorders
Nine lullabies for Langspil (2011) for 4 langspil
 (2011) for somewhat variable quartet
 (2011) for 8 aluminum cans
 (2010) for violin and piano
 (2010) for somewhat variable quartet
 (2010) for somewhat variable quartet
 (2010) for somewhat variable quartet
 (2010) for flute, bass clarinet, cello and piano
 (2010) for harp and percussion
 (2010) for alto flute, bass clarinet, harp, piano and percussion
 (2010) for piano
 (2010) for somewhat variable quartet
 (2009) for variable instrumentation
 (2009) for somewhat variable quartet
 (2009) for harp and percussion
 (2009) for just-intoned single string piano
 (2009) for 5 langspil
 (2009) for somewhat variable quartet
 (2009) for flute, harp and percussion
 (2009) for alto flute and alto recorder
 (2009) for 2 French horns
 (2009) for 8 bassoons
 (2008) for 27 plucked strings
 (2007) for voice
 (2007) for 5 percussion
 (2007) for 2 percussion
 (2007) for string quartet and live electronics
 (2007) for flute and live electronics
 (2007) for 3 percussion, 2 alto saxophones, 1 tenor saxophone, 2 violins and 1 viola
 (2006) for 2 voices and electronics
 (2006) for percussion solo
 (2006) for 3 cellos

All use Guðmundur Steinn's "animated notation" except .

References

External links

Gudmundur Steinn Gunnarsson
Gudmundur Steinn Gunnarsson
21st-century classical composers
Gudmundur Steinn Gunnarsson
Mills College alumni
1982 births
Living people
Male classical composers
21st-century male musicians